Lukas Sparre Klitten (born 1 May 2000) is a Danish professional footballer who plays as a left-back for Silkeborg IF, on loan from Serie B club Frosinone.

Club career

AaB
On 20 September 2017, Klitten got his debut for the first team of AaB, where he came on the pitch from the bench with two minutes left for the final whistle. Klitten also sat on the bench in the Danish Superliga two times in that season. In the winter 2018, Klitten also participated in the first team training camp in Spain alongside his twin brother Oliver Klitten.

Klitten got his Danish Superliga debut for AaB on 22 April 2019, in a match against Randers FC. Klitten played the whole 90 minutes of the game, and was also noted for an assist in the game, which they won 2-0. 

Klitten and his twin brother, Oliver, was promoted to the first team squad for the 2019–20 season. In April 2021, Klitten revealed to the media, that he would like to leave the club because he felt that AaB didn't believe in him. On 21 May 2021 it was confirmed, that he would leave the club on 30 June 2021, as his contract expired.

Frosinone
On 18 June 2021, Klitten signed a four-year deal with Italian Serie B club Frosinone. In his first six months at his new club, Klitten failed to make a single first-team appearance instead playing sparingly for the U19s in Campionato Primavera 2.

On 4 July 2022, Klitten returned to his homeland, when he signes a one-year loan deal with Danish Superliga club Silkeborg IF.

Personal life
Lukas' twin brother, Oliver Klitten, is also a professional football player.

References

External links
 
 Lukas Klitten at DBU

2000 births
Living people
Sportspeople from Aalborg
Association football fullbacks
Danish men's footballers
Danish expatriate men's footballers
Denmark youth international footballers
Denmark under-21 international footballers
Danish twins
Twin sportspeople
Danish Superliga players
AaB Fodbold players
Frosinone Calcio players
Silkeborg IF players
Danish expatriate sportspeople in Italy
Expatriate footballers in Italy